Françoise Legey (1876-1935), was a French-Moroccan physician.

She became the first female physician in Morocco in 1900. She devoted her career in Algeria and Morocco to women's healthcare. She established a maternity hospital in Marrakesh and educated midwives, and a milk dispensary.

She published two books on Moroccan folklore, Légey established in Marrakesh.

References

1876 births
1935 deaths
Moroccan physicians
20th-century French physicians
20th-century Moroccan physicians
20th-century Moroccan women writers
French expatriates in Morocco
French people in French Algeria